Sadhu Aliyur (സദു അലിയൂർ) (1963 – 2020) was an Indian (watercolor) painter and art teacher from Kerala, India. He has done a workshop on the art of watercolor painting  at the State Gallery of Fine Arts. He co-founded "Colouring India foundation" a non profit organisation.

Early life and career 
He was born in the Kozhikode District of Kerala and studied fine arts at Kerala school of Arts, Thalassery. He was an Art instructor at Brushman's school of Arts. Sadhu has been honoured for his talents with awards in Kerala and outside. He has had 23 exhibitions where each time he brings a fresh look at his chosen subject and theme. The Kerala Lalith Kala Academy chose Sadhu for this year's Vijaya Raghavan Gold Medal Endowment. His art work has also been honoured by Turkey International Water Colour society for his contributions in fine art.

He died on 20 February 2020 in Ernakulam.

Art galleries & Exhibitions 
Sadhu has had various solo exhibitions of his works at Mayyazhi  Chithranhaliloode, municipal town hall, Kannur- May 2006. The artist's work has exhibited at many solo or group art exhibitions.

Solo Exhibition 
2001- Mahe, Chalakkara and Pandakkal
2006- Municipal Town Hall, Kannur
2006- Mary Matha Community Hall, Mahe
2006- Lalithakala Academy Art Gallery, Kozhikkode
2007- Karnataka Chithrakala Parishath art gallery, Bangalore
2008- Kerala Lalithakala Akademi Art Gallery, Durbar Hall, Earnakulam
2008- Alliance Française, Pondicherry
2008- Karnataka Chithrakala Parishath Art Gallery, Bangalore
2009- Malayala Kalagramam Art Gallery, New Mahe
2009- Alliance Française, Pondicherry
2009- Kerala Lalithakala Akademi Art Gallery, Durbar Hall, Earnakulam
2010- Kathirur Grama Panchayath Art Gallery, Thalassery 
2010- Karnataka Chithrakala Parishath Art Gallery, Bangalore
2010- Lalit Kala Akademi Art Gallery, New Delhi
2011- Karnataka Chithrakala Parishath Art Gallery, Bangalore
2012- Mary Matha Community Hall, Mahe
2012- Karnataka Chithrakala Parishath Art Gallery, Bangalore
2013- Kerala Lalithakala Academy Art Gallery, Kozhikkode
2013- Sargalaya Art and Craft Village, Iringal, Vadagara
2013- Karnataka Chitrakala Parishth gallery, Bangalore
2014- Karnataka Chitrakala Parishth Gallery, Bangalore
2015- Soryakanthi Art Gallery, Thiruvanthapuram
2015- Kerala lalithakala Akademi Gallery, Thalassery
2015- Durbar Hall Ernakulam, Kerala
2015- Jahangeer art gallery, Mumbai
2016- Soryakanti Art Gallery, Thiruvananthapuram
2016- Karnataka Chitrakala Parishath gallery, Bangalore
2016- State Art Gallery, Hyderabad
2016- Wintage Art Gallery, Payyanoor
2016- Vadagara Block panjayath gallery
2017- Gudham Art gallery, Kozhikode

Group exhibition 
 National Exhibition of Paintings conducted by Kerala Chithrakala Parishath at Karnataka Chithrakala Parishath Art Gallery
 Bangalore and many group shows in various parts of India.

Art workshops

"Hues of Watercolours" at Venkatappa Art Gallery. Organised by Coloring India

References 

Painters from Kerala
1963 births
People from Kozhikode district
Indian watercolourists
2020 deaths